Cyprinidae is a family of freshwater fish commonly called the carp or minnow family. It includes the carps, the true minnows, and relatives like the barbs and barbels. Cyprinidae is the largest and most diverse fish family and the largest vertebrate animal family in general with about 3,000 species, of which only 1,270 remain extant, divided into about 370 genera. Cyprinids range from about 12 mm in size to the  giant barb (Catlocarpio siamensis). By genus and species count, the family makes up more than two-thirds of the ostariophysian order Cypriniformes. The family name is derived from the Greek word  ( 'carp').

Biology and ecology
Cyprinids are stomachless fish with toothless jaws. Even so, food can be effectively chewed by the gill rakers of the specialized last gill bow. These pharyngeal teeth allow the fish to make chewing motions against a chewing plate formed by a bony process of the skull. The pharyngeal teeth are unique to each species and are used by scientists to identify species. Strong pharyngeal teeth allow fish such as the common carp and ide to eat hard baits such as snails and bivalves.

Hearing is a well-developed sense in the cyprinids since they have the Weberian organ, three specialized vertebral processes that transfer motion of the gas bladder to the inner ear. The vertebral processes of the Weberian organ also permit a cyprinid to detect changes in motion of the gas bladder due to atmospheric conditions or depth changes. The cyprinids are considered physostomes because the pneumatic duct is retained in adult stages and the fish are able to gulp air to fill the gas bladder, or they can dispose of excess gas to the gut.

Cyprinids are native to North America, Africa, and Eurasia. Other very large species that can surpass  are the golden mahseer (Tor putitora) and mangar (Luciobarbus esocinus). The smallest known fish is Paedocypris progenetica, reaching  at the longest.

All fish in this family are egg-layers and most do not guard their eggs; however, a few species build nests and/or guard the eggs. The bitterlings of subfamily Acheilognathinae are notable for depositing their eggs in bivalve molluscs, where the young develop until able to fend for themselves.

Cyprinids contain the first and only known example of androgenesis in a vertebrate, in the Squalius alburnoides allopolyploid complex.

Most cyprinids feed mainly on invertebrates and vegetation, probably due to the lack of teeth and stomach; however, some species, like the asp, are predators that specialize in fish. Many species, such as the ide and the common rudd, prey on small fish when individuals become large enough. Even small species, such as the moderlieschen, are opportunistic predators that will eat larvae of the common frog in artificial circumstances.

Some cyprinids, such as the grass carp, are specialized herbivores; others, such as the common nase, eat algae and biofilms, while others, such as the black carp, specialize in snails, and some, such as the silver carp, are specialized filter feeders. For this reason, cyprinids are often introduced as a management tool to control various factors in the aquatic environment, such as aquatic vegetation and diseases transmitted by snails.

Unlike most fish species, cyprinids generally increase in abundance in eutrophic lakes. Here, they contribute towards positive feedback as they are efficient at eating the zooplankton that would otherwise graze on the algae, reducing its abundance.

Relationship with humans

Food 
Cyprinids are highly important food fish; they are fished and farmed across Eurasia. In land-locked countries in particular, cyprinids are often the major species of fish eaten because they make the largest part of biomass in most water types except for fast-flowing rivers. In Eastern Europe, they are often prepared with traditional methods such as drying and salting. The prevalence of inexpensive frozen fish products made this less important now than it was in earlier times. Nonetheless, in certain places, they remain popular for food, as well as recreational fishing, for ornamental use, and have been deliberately stocked in ponds and lakes for centuries for this reason.

Sport 
Cyprinids are popular for angling especially for match fishing (due to their dominance in biomass and numbers) and fishing for common carp because of its size and strength.

As pest control 
Several cyprinids have been introduced to waters outside their natural ranges to provide food, sport, or biological control for some pest species. The common carp (Cyprinus carpio) and the grass carp (Ctenopharyngodon idella) are the most important of these, for example in Florida.

As a pest species 
Carp in particular can stir up sediment, reducing the clarity of the water and making plant growth difficult.

In America and Australia, such as the Asian carp in the Mississippi Basin, they have become invasive species that compete with native fishes or disrupt the environment. 

Cyprinus carpio is a major pest species in Australia impacting freshwater environments, amenity, and the agricultural economy, devastating biodiversity by decimating native fish populations where they first became established as a major pest in the wild in the 1960s. In the major river system of eastern Australia, the Murray-Darling Basin, they constitute 80-90 per cent of fish biomass. 

In 2016 the federal government announced A$15.2 million to fund the National Carp Control Plan to investigate using Cyprinid herpesvirus 3 (carp virus) as a biological control agent while minimising impacts on industry and environment should a carp virus release go ahead. Despite initial, favourable assessment, in 2020 this plan was found to be unlikely to work due to the high fecundity of the fish.

Aquarium fish 
Numerous cyprinids have become important in the aquarium and fishpond hobbies, most famously the goldfish, which was bred in China from the Prussian carp (Carassius (auratus) gibelio). First imported into Europe around 1728, it was much fancied by Chinese nobility as early as 1150AD and after it arrived there in 1502, also in Japan. In the latter country, from the 18th century onwards, the common carp was bred into the ornamental variety known as koi – or more accurately , as  simply means "common carp" in Japanese.

Other popular aquarium cyprinids include danionins, rasborines, and true barbs. Larger species are bred by the thousands in outdoor ponds, particularly in Southeast Asia, and trade in these aquarium fishes is of considerable commercial importance. The small rasborines and danionines are perhaps only rivalled by characids and poecilid livebearers in their popularity for community aquaria.

One particular species of these small and undemanding danionines is the zebrafish (Danio rerio). It has become the standard model species for studying developmental genetics of vertebrates, in particular fish.

Threatened families 
Habitat destruction and other causes have reduced the wild stocks of several cyprinids to dangerously low levels; some are already entirely extinct. In particular, the cyprinids of the subfamily Leuciscinae from southwestern North America have been hit hard by pollution and unsustainable water use in the early to mid-20th century; most globally extinct cypriniform species are in fact leuciscinid cyprinids from the southwestern United States and northern Mexico.

Systematics
The massive diversity of cyprinids has so far made it difficult to resolve their phylogeny in sufficient detail to make assignment to subfamilies more than tentative in many cases. Some distinct lineages obviously exist – for example, the Cultrinae and Leuciscinae, regardless of their exact delimitation, are rather close relatives and stand apart from Cyprininaebut the overall systematics and taxonomy of the Cyprinidae remain a subject of considerable debate. A large number of genera are incertae sedis, too equivocal in their traits and/or too little-studied to permit assignment to a particular subfamily with any certainty.

Part of the solution seems that the delicate rasborines are the core group, consisting of minor lineages that have not shifted far from their evolutionary niche, or have coevolved for millions of years. These are among the most basal lineages of living cyprinids. Other "rasborines" are apparently distributed across the diverse lineages of the family.

The validity and circumscription of proposed subfamilies like the Labeoninae or Squaliobarbinae also remain doubtful, although the latter do appear to correspond to a distinct lineage. The sometimes-seen grouping of the large-headed carps (Hypophthalmichthyinae) with Xenocypris, though, seems quite in error. More likely, the latter are part of the Cultrinae.

The entirely paraphyletic "Barbinae" and the disputed Labeoninae might be better treated as part of the Cyprininae, forming a close-knit group whose internal relationships are still little known. The small African "barbs" do not belong in Barbus sensu stricto – indeed, they are as distant from the typical barbels and the typical carps (Cyprinus) as these are from Garra (which is placed in the Labeoninae by most who accept the latter as distinct) and thus might form another as yet unnamed subfamily. However, as noted above, how various minor lineages tie into this has not yet been resolved; therefore, such a radical move, though reasonable, is probably premature.

The tench (Tinca tinca), a significant food species farmed in western Eurasia in large numbers, is unusual. It is most often grouped with the Leuciscinae, but even when these were rather loosely circumscribed, it always stood apart. A cladistic analysis of DNA sequence data of the S7 ribosomal protein intron1 supports the view that it is distinct enough to constitute a monotypic subfamily. It also suggests it may be closer to the small East Asian Aphyocypris, Hemigrammocypris, and Yaoshanicus. They would have diverged roughly at the same time from cyprinids of east-central Asia, perhaps as a result of the Alpide orogeny that vastly changed the topography of that region in the late Paleogene, when their divergence presumably occurred.

A DNA-based analysis of these fish places the Rasborinae as the basal lineage with the Cyprininae as a sister clade to the Leuciscinae. The subfamilies Acheilognathinae, Gobioninae, and Leuciscinae are monophyletic.

Subfamilies and genera

The 5th Edition of Fishes of the World sets out the following subfamilies:

Subfamily Acheilognathinae 
 Acanthorhodeus (Khanka spiny bitterling)
 Acheilognathus (bitterlings)
 Rhodeus (bitterlings)
 Tanakia (bitterlings)

Subfamily Alburninae
 Alburnoides
 Alburnus (bleaks) 
 Aspiolucius (pike asp)
 Metzia

Subfamily Barbinae 
 Acrossocheilus
 Anchicyclocheilus
 Aulopyge (Dalmatian barbelgudgeon)
 Balantiocheilos
 Barbus (typical barbels and barbs)
 Carasobarbus
 Clypeobarbus
 Dawkinsia 
 Desmopuntius 
 Diptychus
 Enteromius
 Haludaria 
 Hsianwenia
 Kalimantania
 Luciobarbus
 Mesopotamichthys
 Neobarynotus
 Oliotius 
 Oreichthys
 Pethia 
 Pseudobarbus (redfins)
 Puntigrus 
 Puntius (spotted barbs)
 Sahyadria
 Schizopyge (snowtrouts)
 Schizothorax (snowtrouts)
 Sinocyclocheilus (golden-line fish)
 Striuntius 
 Systomus

Subfamily Cultrinae
 Anabarilius
 Chanodichthys
 Culter
 Cultrichthys
 Hainania
 Hemiculter (sharpbellies)
 Ischikauia
 Megalobrama
 Parabramis (white Amur bream)
 Paralaubuca
 Pseudohemiculter
 Pseudolaubuca
 Sinibrama
 Toxabramis

Subfamily Cyprininae 
 Arabibarbus 
 Barboides
 Barbonymus (tinfoil barbs)
 Capoeta (khramulyas)
 Carassioides
 Carassius (Crucian carps and goldfish)
 Cyprinus (typical carps)
 Eechathalakenda
 Gymnocypris

Subfamily Danioninae 
 Amblypharyngodon (carplets)
 Aspidoparia
 Barilius
 Betadevario
 Boraras (rasboras)
 Cabdio
 Chelaethiops
 Chela
 Danio (danios)
 Danionella
 Devario
 Esomus (flying barbs)
 Engraulicypris
 Fangfangia 
 Horadandia
 Inlecypris
 Laubuka
 Leptocypris
 Luciosoma
 Malayochela
 Microdevario
 Microrasbora
 Nematabramis
 Neobola
 Opsaridium
 Opsarius
 Paedocypris
 Pectenocypris
 Raiamas
 Rasbora
 Rasboroides
 Rasbosoma (dwarf scissortail rasbora)
 Rastrineobola (silver cyprinid)
 Salmostoma (razorbelly minnows)
 Securicula
 Sundadanio
 Trigonopoma
 Trigonostigma

Subfamily Gobioninae 
 Abbottina (false gudgeons)
 Belligobio
 Biwia
 Coreius
 Coreoleuciscus
 Gnathopogon
 Gobio (typical gudgeons)
 Gobiobotia
 Gobiocypris
 Hemibarbus (steeds)
 Huigobio
 Ladislavia
 Mesogobio
 Microphysogobio
 Paracanthobrama
 Paraleucogobio
 Parasqualidus
 Platysmacheilus
 Pseudogobio
 Pseudopungtungia
 Pseudorasbora
 Pungtungia
 Rhinogobio
 Romanogobio
 Sarcocheilichthys
 Saurogobio
 Squalidus
 Xenophysogobio

Subfamily Labeoninae 
 Bangana
 Brevibora 
 Cirrhinus (mud carps)
 Cophecheilus
 Crossocheilus
 Discocheilus
 Discogobio
 Discolabeo
 Garra
 Henicorhynchus
 Horalabiosa
 Hongshuia
 Labeo (labeos)
 Labeobarbus (yellowfish)
 Labiobarbus
 Longanalus
 Osteochilichthys
 Osteochilus
 Paraqianlabeo 
 Parasinilabeo
 Placocheilus
 Protolabeo
 Pseudocrossocheilus
 Pseudogyrinocheilus
 Ptychidio
 Qianlabeo
 Rectoris
 Semilabeo
 Sinigarra 
 Sinilabeo
 Sinocrossocheilus
 Stenorynchoacrum 
 Tariqilabeo
 Vinagarra
 Vinalabeo

Subfamily Leptobarbinae
 Leptobarbus

Subfamily Leuciscinae 

 Abramis (common bream)
 Acanthobrama (bleaks)
 Achondrostoma
 Anaecypris
 Acrocheilus (chiselmouth)
 Agosia (longfin dace)
 Algansea (Mexican chubs)
 Aztecula (Aztec chub)
 Ballerus (breams)
 Blicca (silver bream)
 Campostoma (stonerollers) 
 Chondrostoma (typical nases)
 Chrosomus (typical daces)
 Clinostomus (redside daces)
 Codoma (ornate shiner)
 Coreoleuciscus (Korean splendid dace)
 Couesius (lake chub)
 Cyprinella (satinfin shiners)
 Delminichthys
 Dionda (desert minnows)
 Eremichthys (desert dace)
 Ericymba (longjaw minnows)
 Erimystax (slender chubs)
 †Evarra (Mexican daces)
 Exoglossum (cutlips minnows)
 Gila (western chubs)
 Hemitremia (flame chub)
 Hesperoleucus (California roach)
 Hybognathus (silvery minnows)
 Hybopsis (bigeye chubs)
 Iberochondrostoma
 Iberocypris
 Iotichthys (least chub)
 Kottelatia
 Ladigesocypris
 Lavinia (hitch)
 Lepidomeda (spinedaces)
 Leucalburnus
 Leucaspius (moderlieschen)
 Leuciscus (Eurasian daces)
 Leucos 
 Luxilus (highscale shiners)
 Lythrurus (finescale shiners)
 Macrhybopsis (blacktail chubs)
 Margariscus (pearl daces) 
 Meda (pikedace) 

 Moapa (moapa dace)
 Mylocheilus (peamouth)
 Mylopharodon (hardhead)
 Nocomis (hornyhead chubs)
 Notemigonus (golden shiner)
 Notropis (eastern shiners)
 Opsopoeodus (pugnose minnow)
 Oregonichthys (Oregon chubs)
 Orthodon (Sacramento blackfish)
 Pachychilon
 Parachondrostoma
 Pararhinichthys (cheat minnow)
 Pelasgus
 Pelecus (sabre carp)
 Petroleuciscus (Ponto-Caspian chubs and daces)
 Phenacobius (suckermouth minnows)
 Phoxinellus
 Phoxinus (Eurasian minnows and daces)
 Pimephales (bluntnose minnows)
 Plagopterus (woundfin)
 Platygobio (flathead chub)
 Pogonichthys (splittails)
 Protochondrostoma (South European nase)
 Pseudochondrostoma
 Pseudophoxinus
 Pteronotropis (flagfin shiners)
 Ptychocheilus (pikeminnows)
 Relictus (relict dace)
 Rhinichthys (riffle daces, loach minnows) (including Tiaroga)
 Rhynchocypris (Eurasian minnows)
 Richardsonius (redside shiners)
 Rutilus (roaches)
 Sarmarutilus 
 Scardinius (rudds)
 Semotilus (creek chubs)
 Siphateles
 Snyderichthys (spinedaces)
 Squalius (European chubs)
 †Stypodon (stumptooth minnow)
 Tampichthys
 Telestes
 Tribolodon
 Tropidophoxinellus
 Vimba (Vimbas)
 Yuriria

Subfamily Tincinae
 Tanichthys
 Tinca

Subfamily Squaliobarbinae
 Ctenopharyngodon (grass carp)
 Mylopharyngodon (black carp)
 Squaliobarbus

Subfamily Xenocyprinae
 Distoechodon
 Hypophthalmichthys (bighead carps)
 Plagiognathops
 Pseudobrama
 Xenocypris

Incertae sedis

 Aaptosyax (giant salmon carp)
 Acanthalburnus (bleaks)
 Acanthogobio
 Acapoeta
 Albulichthys
 Amblyrhynchichthys
 Ancherythroculter
 Aphyocypris
 Araiocypris
 Aspiorhynchus
 Atrilinea
 Barbichthys
 Barbodes
 Barbopsis (Somalian blind barb)
 Caecobarbus (Congo blind barb)
 Caecocypris
 Candidia
 Capoetobrama
 Catlocarpio
 Chagunius
 Chuanchia
 Coptostomabarbus
 Cosmochilus
 Cyclocheilichthys
 Cyprinion
 Diplocheilichthys
 Discherodontus
 Eirmotus
 Elopichthys
 Epalzeorhynchos
 Folifer
 Gibelion (catla) (some authorities consider this species to belong in the genus Catla)
 Gymnodanio
 Gymnodiptychus
 Hampala
 Hemiculterella
 Hemigrammocypris (close to Aphyocypris?)
 Herzensteinia
 Hypselobarbus
 Hypsibarbus
 Laocypris
 Lepidopygopsis
 Linichthys
 Lobocheilos
 Longiculter
 Luciobrama
 Luciocyprinus
 Macrochirichthys (long pectoral-fin minnow)
 Megarasbora
 Mekongina
 Metzia

 Mystacoleucus
 Naziritor (Zhobi mahseers)
 Neolissochilus (mahseers)
 Nipponocypris
 Ochetobius
 Onychostoma
 Opsariichthys
 Oreoleuciscus
 Osteobrama
 Oxygaster
 Oxygymnocypris
 Parachela
 Paracrossochilus
 Parapsilorhynchus
 Parasikukia
 Paraspinibarbus
 Parator
 Parazacco
 Percocypris
 Phreatichthys (Somalian cavefish)
 Placogobio
 Platypharodon
 Pogobrama
 Poropuntius
 Probarbus
 Procypris
 Prolabeo
 Prolabeops
 Pseudaspius
 Ptychobarbus
 Puntioplites
 Rasborichthys
 Rohtee (Vatani rohtee)
 Rohteichthys
 Sanagia
 Sawbwa (Sawbwa barb)
 Scaphiodonichthys
 Scaphognathops
 Scardinius (rudds)
 Schismatorhynchos
 Schizocypris (snowtrouts)
 Schizopygopsis (snowtrouts)
 Semiplotus
 Sikukia
 Spinibarbus
 Thryssocypris
 Thynnichthys
 Tor (mahseers)
 Troglocyclocheilus
 Tropidophoxinellus
 Typhlobarbus
 Typhlogarra (Iraq blind barb)
 Xenobarbus
 Xenocyprioides
 Zacco

With such a large and diverse family the taxonomy and phylogenies are always being worked on so alternative classifications are being created as new information is discovered, for example:

Phylogeny

Subfamily Probarbinae
 Catlocarpio
 Probarbus
Subfamily Labeoninae
 Tribe Parapsilorhynchini
 Diplocheilichthys
 Neorohita
 Parapsilorhynchus
 Longanalus
 Protolabeo
 Sinilabeo
 Tribe Labeonini
 Bangana
 Cirrhinus (mud carps)
 Decourus
 Gymnostomus
 Incisilabeo
 Labeo (labeos)
 Speolabeo
 Schismatorhynchos
 Tribe Garrini
 Garra
 Paracrossocheilus
 Tariqilabeo
 Osteochilus clade
 Barbichthys
 Crossocheilus
 Epalzeorhynchos
 Henicorhynchus
 Labiobarbus
 Lobocheilos
 Osteochilus
 Thynnichthys
 Semilabeo clade
 Ageneiogarra
 Altigena
 Cophecheilus
 Discogobio
 Hongshuia
 Linichthys
 Mekongina
 Paraqianlabeo 
 Parasinilabeo
 Placocheilus
 Prolixicheilus
 Pseudocrossocheilus
 Pseudogyrinocheilus
 Ptychidio
 Qianlabeo
 Rectoris
 Semilabeo
 Sinigarra 
 Sinocrossocheilus
 Stenorynchoacrum 

Subfamily Torinae

 Acapoeta
 Arabibarbus 
 Barbopsis (Somalian blind barb)
 Carasobarbus
 Hypselobarbus
 Labeobarbus (yellowfish)
 Lepidopygopsis

 Mesopotamichthys
 Naziritor (Zhobi mahseers)
 Neolissochilus (mahseers)
 Osteochilichthys
 Pterocapoeta
 Sanagia
 Tor (mahseers)
 Pterocapoeta

Subfamily Smiliogastrinae

 Barbodes
 Barboides
 Caecobarbus (Congo blind barb)
 Chagunius
 Clypeobarbus
 Coptostomabarbus
 Dawkinsia 
 Desmopuntius 
 Eechathalakenda
 Enteromius
 Haludaria 
 Hampala
 Oliotius 
 Oreichthys

 Osteobrama
 Pethia 
 Prolabeo
 Prolabeops
 Pseudobarbus (redfins)
 Puntigrus 
 Puntius (spotted barbs)
 Rohtee (Vatani rohtee)
 Sahyadria
 Striuntius 
 Systomus
 Xenobarbus

Subfamily Cyprininae [incl. Barbinae]

 Tribe Cyprinini
 Aaptosyax (giant salmon carp)
 Carassioides
 Carassius (Crucian carps and goldfish)
 Cyprinus (typical carps)
 Luciocyprinus
 Paraspinibarbus
 Parator
 Procypris
 Pseudosinocyclocheilus
 Sinibarbus
 Sinocyclocheilus (golden-line fish)
 Typhlobarbus
 Tribe Rohteichthyini
 Albulichthys
 Amblyrhynchichthys
 Anematichthys
 Balantiocheilos
 Barbonymus (tinfoil barbs)
 Cosmochilus
 Cyclocheilichthys
 Cyclocheilos
 Discherodontus
 Eirmotus
 Hypsibarbus
 Kalimantania
 Laocypris
 Mystacoleucus
 Parasikukia
 Poropuntius
 Puntioplites
 Rohteichthys
 Sawbwa (Sawbwa barb)
 Scaphognathops
 Sikukia
 Troglocyclocheilus

 Tribe Acrossocheilini
 Acrossocheilus
 Folifer
 Onychostoma
 Tribe Spinibarbini
 Spinibarbus
 Spinibarbichthys
 Tribe Schizothoracini
 Aspiorhynchus
 Percocypris
 Schizopyge (snowtrouts)
 Schizothorax (snowtrouts)
 Tribe Schizopygopsini
 Chuanchia
 Diptychus
 Gymnocypris
 Gymnodiptychus
 Oreinus
 Oxygymnocypris
 Platypharodon
 Ptychobarbus
 Schizopygopsis (snowtrouts)
 Tribe Barbini
 Aulopyge (Dalmatian barbelgudgeon)
 Barbus (typical barbels and barbs)
 Hsianwenia
 Caecocypris
 Capoeta (khramulyas)
 Cyprinion
 Kantaka
 Luciobarbus
 Scaphiodonichthys
 Schizocypris (snowtrouts)
 Semiplotus

Subfamily Danioninae

 Tribe Paedocypridini
 Paedocypris
 Tribe Sundadanionini
 Fangfangia 
 Sundadanio
 Tribe Rasborini
 Amblypharyngodon (carplets)
 Boraras (rasboras)
 Brevibora 
 Horadandia
 Kottelatia
 Pectenocypris
 Rasbora
 Rasboroides
 Rasbosoma (dwarf scissortail rasbora)
 Trigonopoma
 Trigonostigma
 Tribe Danionini
 Betadevario
 Brachydanio
 Celestichthys
 Chela
 Danio (danios)
 Danionella
 Devario
 Inlecypris
 Laubuka
 Microdevario
 Microrasbora

 Tribe Chedrini
 Barilius
 Bengala
 Cabdio [Aspidoparia]
 Chelaethiops
 Engraulicypris
 Esomus (flying barbs)
 Leptocypris
 Luciosoma
 Malayochela
 Nematabramis
 Neobola
 Opsaridium
 Opsarius
 Raiamas
 Rastrineobola (silver cyprinid)
 Salmostoma (razorbelly minnows)
 Securicula
 Thryssocypris

Subfamily Leptobarbinae
 Leptobarbus

Subfamily Xenocypridinae [incl. Cultrinae & Squaliobarbinae]

 Tribe Squaliobarbini
 Squaliobarbus
 Tribe Opsariichthyini
 Candidia
 Nipponocypris
 Opsariichthys
 Parazacco
 Xenocyprioides
 Tribe Oxygastrini
 Aphyocypris
 Araiocypris
 Gymnodanio
 Hemigrammocypris
 Macrochirichthys (long pectoral-fin minnow)
 Metzia
 Oxygaster
 Parachela
 Paralaubuca
 Rasborichthys
 Tribe Hypophthalmichthyini
 Atrilinea
 Ctenopharyngodon (grass carp)
 Elopichthys
 Hypophthalmichthys (bighead carps)
 Luciobrama
 Mylopharyngodon (black carp)
 Ochetobius

 Tribe Xenocypridini
 Subtribe Xenocypridina
 Distoechodon
 Plagiognathops
 Pseudobrama
 Xenocypris
 Subtribe Cultrina
 Anabarilius
 Chanodichthys
 Culter
 Ischikauia
 Longiculter
 Megalobrama
 Parabramis (white Amur bream)
 Pogobrama
 Sinibrama
 Hemiculter clade
 Hainania
 Hemiculter (sharpbellies)
 Pseudohemiculter
 Pseudolaubuca
 Toxabramis

Subfamily Tincinae
 Tinca

Subfamily Acheilognathinae (bitterlings)
 ?Acanthorhodeus (Khanka spiny bitterling)
 Acheilognathus
 Paratanakia
 Pseudorhodeus
 Rhodeus
 Tanakia

Subfamily Gobioninae

 Hemibarbus-Squalidus clade
 Belligobio
 Hemibarbus (steeds)
 Squalidus
 Tribe Gobionini 
 Subtribe Gobiobotiina
 Gobiobotia
 Xenophysogobio
 Subtribe Gobionina
 Gobio (typical gudgeons)
 Mesogobio
 Romanogobio
 Acanthogobio
 Subtribe Armatogobionina
 Abbottina (false gudgeons)
 Biwia
 ?Huigobio
 Microphysogobio
 Platysmacheilus
 Pseudogobio
 Saurogobio

 Tribe Sarcocheilichthyini
 Coreius
 Coreoleuciscus (Korean splendid dace)
 Gnathopogon
 Gobiocypris
 Ladislavia
 Paracanthobrama
 Paraleucogobio
 ?Parasqualidus
 Pseudopungtungia
 Pseudorasbora
 Pungtungia
 Rhinogobio
 Sarcocheilichthys

Subfamily Tanichthyinae
 Tanichthys

Subfamily Leuciscinae [incl. Alburninae]

 Tribe Phoxinini
 Oreoleuciscus
 Phoxinus (Eurasian minnows and daces)
 Pseudaspius
 Tribe Laviniini
 Subtribe Chrosomina
 Chrosomus (typical daces)
 Subtribe Laviniina
 Eremichthys (desert dace)
 Gila (western chubs)
 Hesperoleucus (California roach)
 Klamathella
 Lavinia (hitch)
 Mylopharodon (hardhead)
 Orthodon (Sacramento blackfish)
 Ptychocheilus (pikeminnows)
 Relictus (relict dace)
 Siphateles
 Tribe Leuciscini
 Pachychilon clade
 Pachychilon
 Alburnoides clade
 Alburnoides
 Primitive Leuciscine clade
 Delminichthys
 Leucalburnus
 Notemigonus (golden shiner)
 Pelasgus
 Subtribe Leuciscina
 Aspiolucius (pike asp)
 Leuciscus (Eurasian daces)
 Pelecus (sabre carp)
 Subtribe Abramina
 Abramis (common bream)
 Acanthobrama (bleaks)
 Capoetobrama
 Mirogrex
 Vimba (Vimbas)
 Subtribe Chondrostomina
 Achondrostoma
 Alburnus (bleaks) 
 Anaecypris
 Chondrostoma (typical nases)
 Iberochondrostoma
 Leucaspius (moderlieschen)
 Leucos 
 Parachondrostoma
 Petroleuciscus (Ponto-Caspian chubs and daces)
 Phoxinellus
 Protochondrostoma (South European nase)
 Pseudochondrostoma
 Pseudophoxinus
 Rutilus (roaches)
 Sarmarutilus 
 Scardinius (rudds)
 Squalius (European chubs)
 Telestes
 Tropidophoxinellus

 Tribe Plagiopterini
 Couesius (lake chub)
 Hemitremia (flame chub)
 Lepidomeda (spinedaces)
 Margariscus (pearl daces) 
 Meda (pikedace) 
 Plagopterus (woundfin)
 Rhynchocypris (Eurasian minnows)
 Semotilus (creek chubs)
 †Stypodon (stumptooth minnow)
 Tribe Pogonichthyini
 Subtribe Pogonichthyina
 Clinostomus (redside daces)
 Iotichthys (least chub)
 Mylocheilus (peamouth)
 Pogonichthys (splittails)
 Richardsonius (redside shiners)
 Subtribe Exoglossina
 Exoglossum (cutlips minnows)
 Oregonichthys (Oregon chubs)
 Pararhinichthys (cheat minnow)
 Rhinichthys (riffle daces, loach minnows)
 Tiaroga
 Subtribe Campostomina
 Campostoma (stonerollers) 
 Nocomis (hornyhead chubs)
 Subtribe Hybognathina
 Agosia (longfin dace)
 Alburnops
 Algansea (Mexican chubs)
 ?Aztecula (Aztec chub)
 ?Ballerus (breams)
 ?Blicca (silver bream)
 Codoma (ornate shiner)
 Cyprinella (satinfin shiners)
 Dionda (desert minnows)
 ?Ericymba (longjaw minnows)
 Erimonax
 Erimystax (slender chubs)
 †Evarra (Mexican daces)
 Graodus
 Hudsonius
 Hybognathus (silvery minnows)
 Hybopsis (bigeye chubs)
 ?Iberocypris
 ?Ladigesocypris
 Luxilus (highscale shiners)
 Lythrurus (finescale shiners)
 Macrhybopsis (blacktail chubs)
 Miniellus
 ?Moapa (moapa dace)
 Notropis (eastern shiners)
 Opsopoeodus (pugnose minnow)
 Phenacobius (suckermouth minnows)
 Pimephales (bluntnose minnows)
 Platygobio (flathead chub)
 Pteronotropis (flagfin shiners)
 ?Snyderichthys (spinedaces)
 Tampichthys
 ?Tribolodon
 ?Yuriria

Incertae sedis

 Acanthalburnus (bleaks)
 Acrocheilus (chiselmouth)
 Ancherythroculter
 Anchicyclocheilus
 Gibelion (catla) (some authorities consider this species to belong in the genus Catla)
 Cultrichthys
 Discocheilus
 Discolabeo
 Hemiculterella
 Herzensteinia

 Horalabiosa
 Megarasbora
 Neobarynotus
 Paracrossochilus
 Phreatichthys (Somalian cavefish)
 Placogobio
 Scardinius (rudds)
 Tropidophoxinellus
 Typhlogarra (Iraq blind barb)
 Zacco

See also
List of fish families

References

External links

 
Ray-finned fish families
Fish of North America
Fish of Asia
Fish of Europe
Fish of Africa
Extant Eocene first appearances